Latendresse is a French surname borne by the following people:

 Alexandrine Latendresse (born 1984), Canadian politician from Quebec
 Guillaume Latendresse (born 1987), Canadian former professional ice hockey player
 John Latendresse (1925–2000), American collector
 Richard Latendresse, Canadian journalist

See also 

 La Tendresse

Surnames
French-language surnames
Surnames of French origin